Marc Berdoll (born 6 April 1953 in Trélazé, Maine-et-Loire) is a former football striker, who earned sixteen caps (five goals) for the France national football team.

During his career he played for Angers SCO, 1. FC Saarbrücken and Olympique de Marseille, Angers SCO again, Amiens SC, US Orléans and L'Hopital. He appeared for France in the 1978 FIFA World Cup, he scored in the first round match against Hungary.

References

External links
 
 
 

1953 births
Living people
Sportspeople from Maine-et-Loire
French footballers
French expatriate footballers
Association football forwards
France international footballers
Angers SCO players
1. FC Saarbrücken players
Olympique de Marseille players
Amiens SC players
Ligue 1 players
Ligue 2 players
Bundesliga players
1978 FIFA World Cup players
Expatriate footballers in Germany
French expatriate sportspeople in Germany
Footballers from Pays de la Loire